Margi Vijayakumar is a Kathakali artist who has specialised in female roles in the classical dance-drama from Kerala, south India. A disciple of the late Padma Shri Kalamandalam Krishnan Nair, he has gained name in his poised handling of Purana characters like Damayanti, Panchali, Mohini and Kunti, mostly opposite star dancer Kalamandalam Gopi.

The 1960-born Vijayakumar, a native of Thonnakkal in Thiruvananthapuram district, was initially trained under Thonnakkal Peethambaran, Inchakkattu Ramachandran Pillai, and Mankulam Vishnu Namboodiri. Equally at ease with choreographically dense roles and those that more profile the Kathakali character, many buffs consider Vijayakumar as a legitimate successor to septuagenarian Kottakkal Sivaraman. Vijayakumar lives in Kudavoor near Thiruvananthapuram.

References

Kathakali exponents
Living people
1960 births
Artists from Thiruvananthapuram
Indian male dancers
Dancers from Kerala
20th-century Indian dancers